Karin Riis-Jørgensen (born 7 November 1952, in Odense)
is a Danish politician and
Member of the European Parliament with the Venstre,
a Vice-Chairwoman of the Alliance of Liberals and Democrats for Europe and sits on
the European Parliament's Committee on Economic and Monetary Affairs. She is the Chairwoman of the European Privacy Association, co-founded with Pat Cox in 2009.

She is a substitute for the Committee on the Internal Market and Consumer Protection,
a member of the Delegation for relations with the People's Republic of China and a
substitute for the Delegation for relations with the United States.

Education
 1978: Degree in law

Career
 1979-1989: Lawyer with the Danish Federation of Small and Medium-sized Enterprises (Copenhagen and Brussels
 1989-1994: Head of department at Coopers & Lybrand
 since 1994: part-time employment with Price Waterhouse Coopers
 since 1994: Member of the Executive of Venstre, Denmark's Liberal Party
 since 2002: Member of the bureau of Venstre's parliamentary group in the Folketing
 since 1994: Member of the European Parliament
 2002-2004: Vice-Chairwoman of the Group of the European Liberal, Democrat and Reform Party (ELDR)

See also
 2004 European Parliament election in Denmark

External links
 
 
 

1952 births
Living people
People from Odense
Venstre (Denmark) MEPs
MEPs for Denmark 2004–2009
MEPs for Denmark 1999–2004
MEPs for Denmark 1994–1999
20th-century women MEPs for Denmark
21st-century women MEPs for Denmark